George Reynolds may refer to:

Politicians
 George Reynolds (MP for Devizes) (died 1577), English politician
 George Reynolds (MP for Rye) (died 1577), English politician
 George M. Reynolds (1862-1935), American politician and businessman

Sports
 George Reynolds (basketball) (born 1947), American basketball player
 George Reynolds (boxer), Welsh lightweight boxing champion
 George Reynolds (racing driver) (1928–2012), winner of the 1964 Bathurst 500

Others
 George Reynolds (businessman) (1937-2021), British businessman and chairman of Darlington Football Club
 George Reynolds (Mormon) (1842–1909), Latter-day Saint leader and a party to the 1878 United States Supreme Court case Reynolds v. United States
 George Reynolds (Medal of Honor) (1839–?), Union Army soldier during the American Civil War
 George Reynolds (priest), English priest, served as Archdeacon of Lincoln from 1725 to 1769
 George Alfred Reynolds (1854–1939), artist and art teacher in South Australia
 George Lazenby Reynolds (1927–1991), bishop of the Episcopal Diocese of Tennessee
 George T. Reynolds (1917–2005), American physicist
 George W. M. Reynolds (1814–1879), British author and journalist

Trains
 British Rail Class 87 locomotive 87006 built 1973